Harveyton is an unincorporated community located in Perry County, Kentucky, United States.

The coal town was built around the Harvey Coal Company mine. A post office was established in 1916 with the name Staub; it was renamed Harveyton in 1923.  Its post office  has since closed.

References

Unincorporated communities in Perry County, Kentucky
Unincorporated communities in Kentucky
Coal towns in Kentucky